Lin Ya-han (born 15 December 1990) is a Taiwanese footballer who plays as a midfielder for Taiwan Mulan Football League club Taipei Bravo, where she serves as its captain, and the Chinese Taipei women's national team.

International goals
Scores and results list Chinese Taipei's goal tally first.

References

1990 births
Living people
Women's association football midfielders
Taiwanese women's footballers
Sportspeople from Keelung
Chinese Taipei women's international footballers
Asian Games competitors for Chinese Taipei
Footballers at the 2014 Asian Games
Footballers at the 2018 Asian Games